Heinrich Sauer (born 23 March 1912, date of death unknown) was an Austrian equestrian. He competed at the 1936 Summer Olympics and the 1948 Summer Olympics.

References

1912 births
Year of death missing
Austrian male equestrians
Olympic equestrians of Austria
Equestrians at the 1936 Summer Olympics
Equestrians at the 1948 Summer Olympics
Place of birth missing